Paddington Bear is a fictional character in children's literature. He first appeared on 13 October 1958 in the children's book A Bear Called Paddington and has been featured in more than twenty books written by British author Michael Bond, and illustrated by Peggy Fortnum and other artists.

The friendly spectacled bear from "darkest Peru" – with his old hat, battered suitcase, duffel coat and love of marmalade – has become a classic character in children's literature. An anthropomorphised bear, Paddington is always polite – addressing people as "Mr", "Mrs" and "Miss" but rarely by first names – and kindhearted, though he inflicts hard stares on those who incur his disapproval. He has an endless capacity for innocently getting into trouble, but he is known to "try so hard to get things right". He was discovered in London Paddington station by the (human) Brown family who adopted him and gives his full name as "Paddington Brown," as his original name in bear language was too hard for them to pronounce.

One of the most beloved British fictional characters, a Paddington Bear soft toy was chosen by British tunnellers as the first item to pass through to their French counterparts when the two sides of the Channel Tunnel were linked in 1994. Paddington books have been translated into 30 languages across 70 titles and have sold more than 30 million copies worldwide. As of June 2016, the Paddington Bear franchise was owned by Vivendi's StudioCanal. Bond, however, continued to own the publishing rights to his series, which was licensed to HarperCollins in April 2017.

Paddington Bear has been adapted for television, films and commercials since its first appearance on the BBC in 1966. Television adaptations include Paddington broadcast from 1976 to 1980. The critically acclaimed and commercially successful films Paddington (2014) and Paddington 2 (2017) were both nominated for the BAFTA Award for Outstanding British Film.

Story

Origin 
Michael Bond based Paddington Bear on a lone teddy bear that he noticed on a shelf in a London shop near Paddington Station on Christmas Eve 1956, which he bought as a present for his wife. He was inspired by the sight, during World War II, of Jewish refugee children from Europe arriving in Britain and of London children being evacuated to the countryside, the evacuees bearing labels perhaps similar to that attached to the bear Paddington "Please look after this bear".

The bear inspired Bond to write a story and in ten days, he had written the first book. The book was given to his agent, Harvey Unna. A Bear Called Paddington was first published on 13 October 1958 by William Collins & Sons.

Paddington Bear 
The first Paddington Bear stuffed toy to be manufactured was created in 1972 by Gabrielle Designs, a small family business run by Shirley and Eddie Clarkson, with the prototype made as a Christmas present for their children Joanna and Jeremy Clarkson, a now well-known British TV presenter, writer and farmer. Michael Bond had awarded the Clarksons the licensing of the toy rights throughout the world.

Shirley Clarkson dressed the stuffed bear in Wellington boots to help it stand upright. (Paddington received Wellingtons for Christmas in Paddington Marches On, 1964.) The earliest bears wore small children's boots manufactured by Dunlop Rubber until production could not meet demand. Gabrielle Designs then produced their boots with paw prints moulded into the soles.

Shirley Clarkson's book describes the evolution of the toy Paddington from Christmas gift to subject of litigation and ultimately commercial success. The family eventually sold the rights to Britain's then leading toy store, Hamleys.

Storyline 

In the first story, the middle-class Brown family found Paddington at Paddington railway station in London. Paddington was sitting on his suitcase with a note attached to his coat that read "Please look after this bear. Thank you." Bond has said that his memories of newsreels showing trainloads of child evacuees leaving London during World War II, with labels around their necks and their possessions in small suitcases, prompted him to do the same for Paddington.

Paddington arrives as a stowaway coming from "Darkest Peru," sent by his Aunt Lucy, one of only a few known relatives aside from an Uncle Pastuzo who gave Paddington his hat, who has gone to live in the Home for Retired Bears in Lima. He claims, "I came in a lifeboat, and ate marmalade. Bears like marmalade." He tells them that no-one can understand his Peruvian name, so the Browns decide to call him Paddington after the railway station in which he was found.

Bond originally wanted Paddington to have "travelled from darkest Africa," but his agent advised him that there were no bears in Africa, and thus it was amended to Peru, home of the spectacled bear.

The Browns take Paddington home to 32 Windsor Gardens near Notting Hill. While there is a real Windsor Gardens off Harrow Road between Notting Hill and Maida Vale, close to the location as described in the books, the Windsor Gardens in the book is fictitious and does not resemble the real road.
Paddington frequents the nearby Portobello Road market, where he is respected by the shopkeepers for driving a hard bargain.

When he gets annoyed with someone, he often gives them one of his special "hard stares", taught to him by Aunt Lucy, which causes them to become flushed and embarrassed. Paddington's adventures usually arise from him misunderstanding something and trying to right (what he perceives to be) unfair or unjust situations. This typically ends with him messing things up in some way. But in all his adventures, he ends up on top and everyone involved can laugh about it. A notable exception is the Browns' next-door neighbour Mr Curry who in every adventure ends up in trouble.

The stories follow Paddington's adventures and mishaps in England, along with some snippets of information about his past. For instance, one story reveals that Paddington was orphaned in an earthquake, before being taken in and raised by his Aunt Lucy.

Characters 
There is a recurring cast of characters, all of whom are in some way entangled in Paddington's misadventures. These include:
 Paddington Bear: A friendly, charismatic and polite bear from Darkest Peru. Paddington was taken in by Aunt Lucy and Uncle Pastuzo after his parents died in an earthquake when he was very young. Paddington moves in with the Browns after Aunt Lucy moves into the Home for Retired Bears. Paddington is usually in some sort of trouble. Paddington's given name is hard to pronounce. The film establishes that it is a series of roars which Mr Brown attempts to imitate, producing something offensive. Paddington is always extremely polite, but inflicts "hard stares" when people forget their manners. Mrs Brown names him after Paddington Station when they're picking Judy, their daughter, up from boarding school.
 Mr Henry Brown: A hapless but well-meaning man who works in Insurance in the City of London. In the film, Henry initially refuses to let Paddington move in with his family, but despite some early mishaps (including Paddington getting earwax on his toothbrush and flooding the bathroom), he eventually warms to Paddington and builds him a bedroom in their attic.
 Mrs Mary Brown: Henry's more serious-minded yet exceptionally friendly wife. In the 1989 animated series Mary and her husband have a 12-year-old American nephew named David Russell. In the film adaptation she works as an author and illustrator and is the first of the Browns to warm to Paddington.
 Judy and Jonathan Brown: The energetic and friendly Brown children. It is never established if one is older than the other, leading to the possibility that they might be twins. In the 1975 series, Paddington, and the 2019 animated series, Judy is older. In the 1989 animated series, and the 1997 animated series Jonathan is older. They meet Paddington for the first time when meeting Judy off the train from boarding school. In the movie Judy and Jonathan are with their parents when they first meet him at Paddington Station, giving him his iconic name.
 Mrs Bird: The Browns' strict but kind and wise housekeeper. Although she is often annoyed by Paddington's antics and mishaps, she is protective of him and very caring. Her first name is never mentioned. In the film adaptation, she is portrayed instead as a Scottish relative of the Browns and the widow of a naval officer.
 Mr Samuel Gruber: Paddington's best friend. The friendly owner of an antique shop on the Portobello Road, with whom Paddington has his elevenses every day. He regularly takes Paddington and the Brown children on outings. He is a Hungarian immigrant. He addresses Paddington as "Mr Brown." Bond based Gruber on his first agent, a German Jew, whom Bond states "was in line to be the youngest judge in Germany, when he was warned his name was on a list, so he got out and came to England with just a suitcase and £25 to his name."
 Mr Reginald Curry: The Browns' mean, nosy, arrogant and bad-tempered next-door neighbour, who serves as a contrast to Mr Gruber. He addresses Paddington simply as "Bear!" Penny-pinching by nature, Mr Curry always wants something for nothing and often persuades Paddington to run errands for him. He tends to invite himself to many of the Browns' special occasions just to sample the snacks. In most of the stories, he gets his comeuppance as a frequent victim of Paddington's misadventures. However, Mr. Curry does sometimes benefit from Paddington's mistakes and has even rewarded Paddington for them on occasion.
 Lucy: Paddington's aunt from Darkest Peru. The film establishes that she and Uncle Pastuzo rescued Paddington rather than being biologically related to him. She was his legal guardian until she had to move into the Home for Retired Bears in Lima, Peru.  In the movie, after a deadly earthquake, she informs Paddington that she is too old to travel to London with him, although in Paddington 2, the residents of Windsor Gardens arrange for her to come to London and see it for herself. In the film adaptation, the explorer Montgomery Clyde names her "Lucy" after his mother.
 Pastuzo: Paddington's wealthy globe-trotting uncle, revealed in the film adaptation to have been named by the explorer Montgomery Clyde—who gave him his hat—after a boxer he met in a bar. In the film adaptation, Uncle Pastuzo is killed by a falling tree during an earthquake, and Paddington retrieves his hat.

Books 
The first book, A Bear Called Paddington, was published in 1958. Although the books are divided into chapters and each book has a time frame, the stories all work as stand-alone stories, and many of them were used like this in the TV series. In order of publication the titles are:

A Bear Called Paddington (1958)
The stories in the first book in the series are:
"Please Look After This Bear" – The Browns first meet Paddington at Paddington station.
"A Bear in Hot Water" – Paddington's first attempt at having a bath is a disaster.
"Paddington Goes Underground" – Paddington's first journey on the Underground causes chaos.
"A Shopping Expedition" – Paddington gets lost during a shopping trip.
"Paddington and 'The Old Master'" – This story introduces Mr Gruber. After hearing Mr Gruber talk about painting, Paddington decides to try his hand at it himself.
"A Visit to the Theatre" – Paddington goes to see a play with the Browns. Unable to understand the concept of drama, he believes what he sees to be real.
"Adventure at the Seaside" – Paddington takes part in a sandcastle competition.
"A Disappearing Trick" – Paddington receives a conjuring outfit for his first birthday with the Browns, and puts on a magic show. This story introduces the Browns' grumpy neighbour Mr Curry.
More About Paddington (1959)
The stories in the second book in the series are:
"A Family Group" – Paddington takes a family photo of the Browns.
"A Spot of Decorating" – Paddington tries to help Mr Brown by decorating his room whilst the family are out.
"Paddington Turns Detective" – Paddington investigates the disappearance of Mr Brown's prize marrow.
"Paddington and the Bonfire" – The Browns hold a bonfire party at No. 32 Windsor Gardens.
"Trouble at No.32" – Paddington catches a nasty chill when a winter prank goes disastrously wrong.
"Paddington and the Christmas Shopping" – Paddington buys presents for the Brown family.
"Christmas" – Paddington enjoys his first Christmas with the Browns.
Paddington Helps Out (1960)
The stories in the third book in the series are:
"A Picnic on the River" – Paddington gets more than he bargained for when the Browns hire a boat for a day on the river.
"Paddington Makes a Bid" – Mr Gruber takes Paddington to an auction sale.
 "Paddington and 'Do It Yourself'" –  After reading a DIY magazine, Paddington tries to make presents for Mr Brown and (reluctantly) Mr Curry.
"A Visit to the Cinema" – The Browns go to see a cowboy film. When the special attraction is cancelled, Paddington comes to the rescue.
"Something Nasty in the Kitchen" – With Mr and Mrs Brown sick in bed and the rest of the family out of the house, Paddington prepares dinner.
"Trouble at the Launderette" – A reluctant Paddington takes Mr Curry's laundry to be cleaned.
"Paddington Dines Out" – The Browns organise a special meal for Paddington's birthday.
Paddington Abroad (1961)
The stories in the fourth book in the series are:
"Paddington Prepares" – Mr Brown announces a holiday in France.
"A Visit to the Bank" – A misunderstanding causes uproar at the bank.
"Trouble at the Airport" – Airport officials suspect Paddington is travelling without a passport.
"Paddington Saves the Day" – The Browns' car gets a puncture and Mr Brown organises an al-fresco meal.
"Paddington and the 'Pardon'" – Paddington takes part in a local festival.
"A Spot of Fishing" – The Browns and Paddington go on a fishing trip and get marooned.
"Paddington Takes to the Road" – Paddington participates in the Tour de France.
Paddington at Large (1962)
The stories in the fifth book in the series are:
"Paddington Breaks the Peace" – Paddington causes chaos trying to mow Mr Curry's lawn.
"Mr Gruber's Outing" – Mr Gruber takes Paddington, Judy, and Jonathan to the park.
"Goings-On at Number Thirty-two" – Paddington mistakes a man installing the Browns' new television for a burglar.
"Paddington Hits the Jackpot" – Paddington wins a TV quiz show.
"A Sticky Time" – Paddington tries to make toffee.
"Trouble in the Bargain Basement" – Paddington goes Christmas shopping.
"Paddington and the Christmas Pantomime" – Paddington helps out at a local panto.
Paddington Marches On (1964)
The stories in this sixth collection are:
"Paddington and the Cold Snap" – Paddington tries to defrost Mr Curry's pipes.
"A Most Unusual Ceremony" – Paddington is invited to a ceremony at a marmalade factory.
"Paddington Makes a Clean Sweep" – Paddington makes a mess cleaning the chimney.
"Mr Gruber's Mystery Tour" – Paddington and Mr Gruber go on a mystery tour of London.
"Paddington Saves the Day" – Paddington plays cricket.
"A Day by the Sea" – Paddington and the Browns go to the seaside.
"An Unexpected Party" – The Browns celebrate Paddington's (temporary) return to Peru with a farewell party.
Paddington at Work (1966)
The stories in this seventh collection are:
"A Bear at Sea" – Paddington sails back from Peru.
"Anchors Away" – Paddington attends a party on board the liner sailing back from Peru.
"Paddington Buys a Share" – Paddington is persuaded to buy a share in a business.
"A Visit to the Stock Exchange" – Paddington tries to sell his newly acquired share.
"Paddington in a Hole" – Paddington helps Mr Curry renovate his house.
"Too Much off the Top" – Paddington answers a job advert in a barber's shop.
"Paddington Steps Out" – Paddington and the Browns attend a ballet performance.
Paddington Goes to Town (1968)
The stories in this eighth collection are:
"A Day to Remember" – Paddington acts as an usher at a friend's wedding.
"Paddington Hits Out" – Paddington accompanies Mr Curry to a golf competition.
"A Visit to the Hospital" – Visiting Mr Curry in hospital, Paddington meets a psychiatrist.
"Paddington Finds a Cure" – Paddington finds a cure for Mr Curry's ailments.
"Paddington and the 'Finishing Touch'" – Paddington seeks the 'finishing touch' to Mr Gruber's patio.
"Everything Comes to Those Who Wait" – Paddington's attempts to go carol singing do not go according to plan.
"Paddington Goes to Town" – Paddington, the Brown family, and Mr Gruber visit the Christmas lights and decorations in the west end of London.
Paddington Takes the Air (1970)
The stories in this ninth collection are:
"A Visit to the Dentist" – Paddington's first visit to a dentist does not go according to plan.
"A Stitch in Time" – Paddington's skills with a sewing machine are tested by Mr Curry.
"Riding High" – Paddington enters a gymkhana at Judy's school, at which the secret of his horsemanship is revealed.
"Paddington Strikes a Bargain" – Paddington goes to great lengths to help Mr Gruber enter his classic car in the local parade.
"The Case of the Doubtful Dummy" – Paddington takes inspiration from the stories of the detective Carlton Dale to carry out his own investigation.
"Paddington Recommended" – Paddington visits a department store where a case of mistaken identity occurs in the restaurant.
"The Last Dance" – Paddington displays his newly acquired knowledge of ballroom dancing. 
Paddington's Garden (1972)
A single-story picture book. Later adapted--with new illustrations--as Paddington in the Garden, and collected in The Paddington Treasury for the Very Young (2010).
Paddington's Blue Peter Story Book (1973)
This collects together stories previously published in the Blue Peter annuals, which Michael Bond had written during his time as a cameraman on Blue Peter. The stories all include references to Blue Peter and feature the contemporary Blue Peter presenters, John Noakes, Peter Purves, and Valerie Singleton.
"Paddington Takes the Cake" – Paddington is invited to bake a Christmas cake on Blue Peter.
"Paddington Gets the Bird" – Paddington looks after Joey, the Blue Peter parrot, while John, Val and Peter are on their Summer Expedition.
"Paddington to the Rescue" – The Browns take a surprising trip to the seaside.
"Paddington Goes Halves" – Mr Curry agrees to help Paddington enter a Blue Peter origami competition.
"Paddington Gives a Service" – Paddington helps out when a tennis doubles match in the Blue Peter studio needs a player at short notice.
"Paddington Weighs In" – Paddington investigates when he hears the Blue Peter presenters have lost pounds at a new hotel.
Paddington at the Tower (1973)
A single-story picture book, aimed at younger readers.
Paddington on Top (1974)
The tenth collection features the following stories:
"Paddington Goes to School" – Paddington attends a local school and encounters a fearsome teacher.
"Paddington Cleans Up" – Paddington encounters a vacuum cleaner salesman, whose offer proves too good to be true.
"Paddington Goes to Court" – Mr Gruber aims to explain to Paddington the workings of the law.  On a trip to the Royal Courts of Justice, Paddington gets unexpectedly called as a witness.
"A Birthday Treat" – The Browns visit the seaside resort of Brightsea to celebrate Paddington's birthday.  Whilst there, Paddington takes an interest in a new leisure activity.
"Keeping Fit" – Paddington orders a 'home body-building outfit', from an advertisement in one of Mrs Brown's magazines.
"Paddington in Touch" – The Browns are invited to a rugby match between the local school and a visiting team from Peru.
"Comings and Goings at Number Thirty-two" – The Browns host a visitor from Peru in the run-up to Christmas.
Paddington Takes the Test (1979)
The eleventh collection in the main series includes these stories:
"Paddington at the Wheel" – Mr Brown has been ordered to re-take his driving test after a minor accident, but a series of misunderstandings leads to Paddington ending up behind the wheel instead.
"In and Out of Trouble" – A reluctant Paddington is roped in to test Mr Curry's "new" hammock.
"Paddington and the Stately Home" – Mr Gruber takes Paddington, Jonathan, and Judy to visit a stately home.
"Paddington and 'Bob-a-Job'" – Paddington takes part in the local scouts' "bob-a-job" week.
"Paddington Gets a Rise" – Paddington tries to make money to buy Mr Brown a birthday present.
"Mr Curry Lets Off Steam" – Mr Curry bags himself a free go at Mr Brown's new sauna bath, but lives to regret it.
"Pantomime Time" – The Browns and Mr Gruber enjoy a Christmas treat.
Paddington on Screen (1980)
Following up Paddington's Blue Peter Story Book (1973) this collection collects the remaining stories published in the Blue Peter annuals, which Michael Bond had written during his time as a cameraman on Blue Peter. These stories again feature occasional appearances from the Blue Peter presenters, including newcomer Lesley Judd and newsreader Angela Rippon.
"Paddington's Puzzle" – Paddington's new jigsaw does not please Mr Curry.
"A Spoonful of Paddington" – Paddington takes up spoon bending after seeing Uri Geller on Blue Peter.
"Paddington Clocks In" – The ticking from Paddington's suitcase causes alarm at BBC TV Centre.
"Paddington Passes Through" – Paddington mislays his shopping basket on wheels in BBC TV Centre, leading to his impromptu appearance on a number of BBC programmes.
"Paddington Takes a Cut" – Paddington attempts some topiary in Mr Curry's garden.
"Paddington's Christmas Treasure Hunt" – Paddington takes up metal detecting.
"Paddington in the 'Hot Seat'" – Paddington takes part in the TV quiz show 'Sage of Britain'.
Paddington at the Zoo (1984)
A single-story picture book, aimed at younger readers. Later collected in The Paddington Treasury for the Very Young (2010)
Paddington and the Knickerbocker Rainbow (1985)
A single-story picture book, aimed at younger readers.
Paddington's Painting Exhibition (1985)
A single-story picture book, aimed at younger readers.
Paddington at the Fair (1985)
A single-story picture book, aimed at younger readers.
Paddington at the Palace (1986)
A single-story picture book, aimed at younger readers. Later collected in The Paddington Treasury for the Very Young (2010)
Paddington's Magical Christmas (1988)
A single-story picture book, aimed at younger readers. This book has not yet been collected or reissued in line with the other picture books.
Paddington Bear and the Busy Bee Carnival (1998)
A single-story picture book aimed at young readers. Paddington attends river boat carnival, where he tries to win in a spelling bee competition by collecting words starting with the letter "B".
Paddington Goes to Hospital (2001)
A single-story picture book, aimed at younger readers. Co-written with Karen Jankel. The author's profits went to Action Research.
Paddington and the Grand Tour (2003)
A single-story picture book, aimed at younger readers.
Paddington Here and Now (2008)
This twelfth collection in the main series was published almost thirty years after the last and coincided with Paddington's fiftieth anniversary. The stories included in this volume are:
"Parking Problems" – After Paddington's shopping basket on wheels is towed away, his visit to the local police station does not go according to plan.
"Paddington's Good Turn" – Paddington's efforts at crime prevention have surprising results.
"Paddington Strikes a Chord" – The arrival of a special piano in Mr Gruber's shop leads to a memorable recital.
"Paddington Takes the Biscuit" – Paddington and the Browns celebrate Halloween. Mr Gruber is unimpressed.
"Paddington Spills the Beans" – Paddington speaks to an investigative reporter.  The Browns worry about the consequences.
"Paddington Aims High" – Paddington visits a travel agent to plan a journey.  Then a traveller arrives at No. 32 Windsor Gardens.
"Paddington's Christmas Surprise" – Paddington's visitor organises a surprise trip for the Brown family.
Paddington Races Ahead (2012)
The thirteenth collection in the main series includes these stories:
"Mr Curry's Birthday Treat" – Paddington endeavours to help with Mr Curry's 'birthday list'.
"A Fishy Business" – A new artwork in Mr Gruber's shop inspires Paddington to create a collage.
"Spring Cleaning" – Paddington's attempts to clean his room result in a surprising discovery.
"A Chance Encounter" – On his way to see Mr Gruber, Paddington meets a very persistent sports journalist.
"Paddington in Training" – Paddington visits a new health club on the Portobello Road. 
"Paddington Flies a Kite" – A picnic in the park leads to some unexpected 'noises off' at an outdoor production of Hamlet.
"Paddington on Track" – '''News' of Paddington's sporting prowess reaches Peru: a film-maker is sent to London to record Paddington's feats.Paddington Goes for Gold (2012)
A single-story picture book, aimed at younger readers. Released to coincide with London hosting the Summer Olympic Games.Love from Paddington (2014)
A book of letters from Paddington and his Aunt Lucy, which retell stories seen in the previous collections from Paddington's perspective.Paddington's Finest Hour (2017)
The fourteenth collection of the main series includes these stories:
"Parking Problems" – Paddington's attempts to post a letter attract the attention of the police.
"A Bird in the Hand" – Paddington inspects his garden rockery.
"Curry's the Name" – Paddington helps Mr Curry in his garden.  But what purpose has Mr Curry in mind?
"Paddington's Magical Moments" – Paddington's magic tricks at Mr Gruber's surprise birthday party do not amuse Mr Curry.
"Dinner for One" – Paddington enters a popular TV cookery competition.
"A Visit to the Cleaners" – Paddington attempts some make-do-and-mend clothes repairs.
"Paddington's Finest Hour" – The Browns go to the theatre to see a Variety show.  Paddington partakes of some audience participation.
 Paddington at St. Paul's (2018)
This picture book is the finale of the original Paddington series.It was finished before Michael Bond's death. The final book in the "Paddington" series to be written by the creator himself was released on 27 June 2018 to mark the anniversary of the day that Michael Bond died and the 60th anniversary of A Bear Called Paddington (1958).

 Special publications 
 The Adventures of a Bear Called Paddington; A play for children (1974) adapted by Alfred Bradley from the stories by Michael Bond. Music by Bert Chappell. Lyrics by Bert Chappell, Brenda Johnson, and Alfred Bradley. Published and licensed by Samuel French Ltd. London. A full-length small-cast musical play in two acts. The play opened in 1973 in the Nottingham Playhouse and the Duke of York Theatre in London the following year.
 Paddington on Stage – Plays for children (1974) Adapted by Michael Bond and Alfred Bradley. A book of seven short play scripts based on the Paddington stories and intended for children to perform. The scripts were based on the play The Adventures of a Bear Called Paddington published by Samuel French. The plays included are: The Arrival of Paddington; Paddington Paints a Picture; Paddington has a Holiday; Paddington Visits the Dentist; Paddington Goes to the Launderette, Paddington Goes to the Hospital; Paddington Turns Detective. The book also contains costume notes and the lyrics of two songs: I Try So Hard and Paddington Bear.
 Paddington Rules the Waves (2008) A £1 World Book Day Book.
 Paddington Here and Now (2008) Published as part of the series' 50th-anniversary celebrations.Paddington Bear: a welcome immigrant – Daniel Hannan, Daily Telegraph. Accessed 12 July 2008.
 Paddington's Cookery Book (2011)

 Blue Peter and beyond 
Author Michael Bond was also a BBC TV cameraman who worked on the popular children's television programme Blue Peter. After this was revealed in 1965, a special Paddington story, in which he got mixed up in the programme itself, appeared in the Blue Peter Annuals for many years. They were collected in the novel-length Paddington's Blue Peter Story Book in 1973. A second book based around Blue Peter was titled Paddington on Screen.

 Television adaptations

 Jackanory (1966) 
The first TV adaptation of Paddington was a serialised reading of The Adventures of Paddington Bear by Thora Hird for Jackanory in 1966. The 15-minute episodes were broadcast over five afternoons from 14 March 1966. No episodes survive in the BBC archives.

 Once Upon a Time (1968–1970) 
ITV's answer to Jackanory was Once Upon a Time, which featured three readings by Ian Carmichael in 1968 and a fourth in 1970. The episodes do not survive in the ITV archives.

 Jackanory (1970) 
Christmas Eve 1970 saw a reading of Paddington's Christmas by John Bird. The episode no longer exists in the BBC archives.

 Paddington (1976) 

One of the best-known adaptations of Paddington Bear is the stop-motion animated BBC television series Paddington. The series was written by Michael Bond and directed and animated by Ivor Wood at London-based animation company FilmFair (now WildBrain). It was first broadcast on 5 January 1976. The storylines were based on comedic incidents from the books, chosen to appeal to the TV audience which included much younger children than those the books were written for.

This series had an extremely distinctive appearance: Paddington was a stop-motion puppet moving in a three-dimensional space in front of gloomy two-dimensional backgrounds, which were frequently sparse black-and-white line drawings, while all other characters were 2D drawings. In one scene, Mr Brown is seen to hand Paddington a jar of marmalade that becomes 3D when Paddington touches it. Animator Ivor Wood also worked on The Magic Roundabout, The Wombles and Postman Pat. The series was narrated by Michael Hordern, who also voiced all of the characters.

In the U.S., episodes aired on PBS, on the syndicated series Romper Room, on Nickelodeon as a segment on the programme Pinwheel and on USA Network as a segment on the Calliope (TV series) in the late 1970s and early 1980s, as well as in between preschool programming on The Disney Channel as a segment on the program Lunch Box from the late 1980s into the 1990s.The Disney Channel Magazine, Vol. 9, no. 6, November/December 1991: p. 34. The series also aired on HBO in between features, usually when they were airing children's programmes. The series won a silver medal at the New York Film and Television Festival in 1979, the first British animated series to do so.

Buena Vista Home Video released 6 volumes of episodes for NTSC/Region 1 Format:
 Vol.1 Please Look After This Bear
 Vol.2 Paddington, P. I.
 Vol.3 All Paws
 Vol.4 A Paddington Christmas
 Vol.5 Backstage Bear
 Vol.6 Bargain Basement Bear

In 2011, Mill Creek Entertainment under the licence of Cookie Jar Entertainment released the complete original 1975 Paddington Bear series on DVD. The 3-disc set also featured three half-hour television specials, "Paddington Birthday Bonanza", "Paddington Goes To School" and "Paddington Goes to the Movies" along with 15 bonus episodes of The Wombles and Huxley Pig. It also had special features for children on DVD-ROM.

 Paddington Bear (1989) 

Paddington Bear's 1989 television series was the first by a North American company, Hanna-Barbera, a co-production with Central Independent Television. This series was traditional two-dimensional animation and featured veteran voice actor Charlie Adler as Paddington and Tim Curry, fittingly enough, as Mr Curry. The character of an American boy named David, Jonathan and Judy Brown's cousin who arrived in London on the same day as Paddington, was added to the stories in the 1989 cartoon.

 The Adventures of Paddington Bear (1997) 

Canadian Cinar Films produced the third series, which was first broadcast in 1997 and consisted of traditional two-dimensional colour animation. The show was called The Adventures of Paddington Bear.

 Children's Party at the Palace (2006) 

Paddington appeared along with other British children's literature characters in the televised broadcast of Queen Elizabeth II's 80th birthday party event held in the Garden at Buckingham Palace on 25 June 2006. He has a part in The Queen's Handbag pantomime where he and Rupert Bear are recruited by Percy the Park Keeper to find the handbag alongside Winnie-the-Pooh, Kipper the Dog, Spot the Dog, Mowgli from The Jungle Book and The White Rabbit from Alice in Wonderland.

 "The Official BBC Children in Need Medley" (2009) 

Paddington Bear appeared in "The Official BBC Children in Need Medley" with Peter Kay along with several other animated characters, which included popular British children's TV characters Thomas the Tank Engine, Bob the Builder, Teletubbies, Peppa Pig and Thunderbirds. The single's cover art is a parody of the cover of Sgt. Pepper's Lonely Hearts Club Band by The Beatles. In the music video (which features the Animated All Star Band meeting and recording the song in a studio, spoofing other charity songs in the style of Band Aid's "Do They Know It's Christmas?") Paddington makes a grand appearance by winking at the cameramen when they take photos of him; Kay's character Big Chris tries to put a cloak on Paddington, but it keeps sliding off. He also joins the rest of the group for the final act. The song reached No. 1 on the UK Singles Chart.

 The Adventures of Paddington (2019) 

StudioCanal made a computer-animated TV series based on the live-action Paddington films. The studio teamed with David Heyman and US Nickelodeon to make the series with animation studio Blue-Zoo, with the working title of Paddington and Ben Whishaw reprising the role from the two live-action films. The series officially made its debut on 20 December 2019.

 Film adaptations 

In September 2007, Warner Bros. and producer David Heyman announced a film adaptation of Paddington Bear. Hamish McColl, who penned Mr. Bean's Holiday, would write the script. The film would not be an adaptation of an existing story, but "draw inspiration from the whole series" and feature a computer animated Paddington Bear interacting with a live-action environment. Colin Firth had been announced to voice Paddington, however he announced his withdrawal on 17 June 2014, saying: "It's been bittersweet to see this delightful creature take shape and come to the sad realization that he simply doesn't have my voice". In July 2014, it was announced that Ben Whishaw had replaced Firth.

On 25 June 2012, an official teaser poster was released for Paddington, stating that it would be released during 2014. A trailer was subsequently released confirming the release to be 28 November 2014. On 17 November 2014, the British Board of Film Classification (BBFC) gave the film a PG certificate and advised parents that the film contained "dangerous behaviour, mild threat, mild sex references, [and] mild bad language". Paul King, the film's director, told BBC reporter Tim Muffett: "I'm not surprised about that [the PG certificate] but I don't think it's a PG for sexiness. That I would find very odd". Paddington's creator, Michael Bond, said he was "totally amazed" at the BBFC's advice. After the film's distributor challenged the certification, the BBFC revised the wording of its parental guidance, replacing "mild sex references" with "innuendo". It also further qualified the "mild bad language" as "infrequent", saying it referred to "a single mumbled use of 'bloody'".

To celebrate the release of the film, the Paddington Trail was launched. From 4 November until 30 December 2014, 50 Paddington statues were placed around London close to museums, parks, shops and key landmarks. The statues have been created by artists, designers and celebrities, including supermodel Kate Moss, actresses Nicole Kidman and Emma Watson, footballer David Beckham, and actors Benedict Cumberbatch and Downton Abbey star Hugh Bonneville. As the lead charity partner of The Paddington Trail, the National Society for the Prevention of Cruelty to Children (NSPCC) held an online auction in November and a live auction in December for the statues, with all proceeds from the sale going to the charity.

During 2015, it was announced that the studio was in talks with the producer about a sequel. The sequel, titled Paddington 2, was released on 10 November 2017 in the UK to universal acclaim. The mantra from the film, "If we're kind and polite, the world will be right", was taught to Paddington by his beloved Aunt Lucy in times of both duress and joy. New cast members included Hugh Grant as Phoenix Buchanan, a narcissistic actor and former West End theatre star, reduced to making adverts for dog food, and Brendan Gleeson as Knuckles McGinty, the short-tempered prison cook. On 18 January 2018, it became the most-reviewed film ever to remain at 100% on Rotten Tomatoes, with 164 positive reviews, beating Toy Story 2, which had 163 positive reviews at the time.

Comedian and later President of Ukraine Volodymyr Zelensky voiced Paddington in the Ukrainian dubbing of the films Paddington (2014) and Paddington 2 (2017). Upon hearing of this, Hugh Bonneville, who played Henry Brown in both films, tweeted "Thank you, President Zelensky".

 Awards 

The 2014 film Paddington was well received. It won several nominations and awards, including Best British Feature Film Writing at the British Screenwriters’ Awards, Best Comedy at the Empire Awards, and Best Screenplay at the Writers’ Guild of Great Britain. The film received nominations at the 68th British Academy Film Awards for Best Adapted Screenplay as well as Best British Film at the Empire Awards, Best Fantasy Film at the Saturn Award, and Best Male Lead Vocal Performance in a Feature Film at the BTVA Feature Film Voice Acting Awards.

The 2017 sequel Paddington 2 received even more nominations and awards. It was nominated for Outstanding British Film of the Year, Best Supporting Actor (Hugh Grant), and Best Screenplay at the 72nd British Academy Film Awards. In addition, it won Support Actor of the Year and British/Irish Actress of the Year at the London Critics Circle Film Awards. Likewise, the film received 50 nominations including for Best Costume Design and Best Visual Effects at the San Diego Film Critics Society Awards and Best Art Direction/ Production Design at the Chicago Film Critics Association Awards.

 Reception and analysis 

Paddington Bear is among the most popular characters in children's literature. The actor Stephen Fry, who narrated Paddington audiobooks, stated "Michael Bond's bear is a Great British icon with his charm, humour, spirit of adventure and generosity". Devan Coggan writing for Entertainment Weekly saw a similarity between Paddington and Winnie-the-Pooh, referring to them as two "extremely polite British bears without pants", adding that "both bears share a philosophy of kindness and integrity". The New York Times praised the original book A Bear Called Paddington (1958). Similarly, The Horn Book Guide, a bimonthly magazine dedicated to reviewing children's literature, praised the short story Paddington Helps Out (1960). Both articles emphasise the welcoming Brown family and how the book captures Paddington's adventurous, charming, and funny attitude. Further, The New York Times' article highlights the resemblance of Paddington to a child, indicating that 6 to 9 year olds could enjoy both the colourful illustrations and the book's content.

In 2021, the British Library hosted an exhibition on Paddington Bear. The Telegraph journalist Claire Allfree acknowledges Paddington's difficulty as an immigrant to integrate into British culture. For example, that "children should practise their own hard stares and to imagine what objects they might take with them on their long journey." Scholars Angela Smith, Kyle Grayson and Lisa Dussenberry additionally discuss the role of Otherness in the Paddington series.Grayson, Kyle. "How to Read Paddington Bear: Liberalism and the Foreign Subject in A Bear Called Paddington." British Journal of Politics & International Relations 15, no. 3 (2013): 378-393. doi:10.1111/j.1467-856X.2012.00506.x. Smith writes that though children will be able to subtly learn the complex political and psychological issues of migration, Paddington nonetheless enforces assimilation to the dominant culture. Grayson posits that even with specific negotiations of differences, Paddington remains in a precarious position in society. On a positive tone about Paddington's immigration theme, Dussenberry appreciates how Mr. Gruber, a Hungarian immigrant and Paddington's friend, supports and guides Paddington with his adjustment into the new society.

 In popular culture 

Cadbury launched a Paddington Bear branded chocolate bar in 1977. Paddington was featured on the Royal Mail 1st class stamp in the Animal Tales series released on 10 January 2006 and had previously been featured on one of the 1st class Greetings Messages stamps, released by Royal Mail on 1 February 1994.

Paddington Bear featured in the Marmite television advertisement (first broadcast in the UK on 13 September 2007), in which he tries a marmite and cheese sandwich instead of his traditional marmalade sandwich. 

Paddington Bear audiobooks have been read by a number of celebrities. In 2007, Stephen Fry narrated the audiobook More About Paddington (1959), and in 2008 he received the Audie Award for Young Listeners' Title from the Audio Publishers Association in the U.S.

On 13 October 2008, Google celebrated the 50th anniversary of the first Paddington publication by placing an image of the travelling bear with a sign showing Peru and London incorporated into Google's logo.

In 2010, Paddington Bear was first used in marketing for Robertson's, appearing on the jars of their Golden Shred marmalade. In November 2014, a balloon with Paddington Bear was introduced in the Macy's Thanksgiving Day Parade.

A song about Paddington Bear, "Shine" was released on 13 January 2015 by Gwen Stefani and Pharrell Williams, to coincide with the U.S. release of Paddington.

As part of the promotion of film and to celebrate cross-cultural links between the UK and Peru, the British Embassy and StudioCanal commissioned a statue of Paddington in Parque Salazar in the Miraflores district of the Peruvian capital, Lima, which was unveiled in July 2015.

The 2017 Marks & Spencer Christmas advertisement for television shows Paddington mistaking a petty criminal for Santa Claus and helping him right the wrong by returning the gifts to their rightful owners.

Marking the 60th anniversary of the publication of the first Paddington children's book, in 2018 an image of Paddington Bear (sitting at Paddington station) appeared on 50p coins in the UK. His creator Michael Bond was the second author to have their character feature on the coin after Beatrix Potter whose literary creation Peter Rabbit appeared two years earlier.

In the 2022 film The Unbearable Weight of Massive Talent, Paddington 2 was referenced when the characters Javi (Pedro Pascal) and Nicolas Cage (Nicolas Cage) were discussing their favourite movies. When asked why Paddington 2 was referred to, director Tom Gormican said "It's a perfect movie...we were big fans" and Cage described it as "wonderful".

In a pre-recorded comedy segment at the opening of the Platinum Party at the Palace on 4 June 2022, Paddington joined Queen Elizabeth II for tea and marmalade sandwiches at Buckingham Palace before they tapped their tea cups to the beat of "We Will Rock You", prior to Queen + Adam Lambert performing the song outside live. During their meeting, the Queen reveals to Paddington that she too always keeps a marmalade sandwich for emergencies, in her handbag. The video would turn out to be one of the last public appearances of Elizabeth II before her death on 8 September 2022, and as a result Paddington Bear became a symbol of mourning for the Queen. An image of Paddington and the Queen walking hand-in-hand was widely shared and re-printed, mourners left stuffed Paddington Bears and marmalade sandwiches at memorials, and the BBC announced that both Paddington'' films would air on the weekend of the funeral.

References

Notes

External links 
 Paddington Bear
 
 
 

 
British novels adapted into films
Characters in British novels of the 20th century
Characters in children's literature
Fictional refugees
Fictional people from London
Fictional Peruvian people
Literary characters introduced in 1958
Male characters in literature
British novels adapted into television shows
Books about bears
Novels about orphans
Novels set in London
Orphan characters in literature
Series of children's books
Anthropomorphic bears